William Thomas Michael Lansdowne (born 9 November 1935) is an English former professional footballer who played as a midfielder.

Career
Born in Shoreditch, Lansdowne attended Shoreditch Secondary School and played junior football with Loughton Town. He began his career in non-league football with Woodford Town, before making his professional debut in the Football League with West Ham United, making 57 league appearances for them between 1956 and 1963. After retiring as a player, Lansdowne joined the coaching staff at West Ham United.

Personal life
His son Billy was also a professional footballer. His grandson, Billy Jr, played for Nybro IF, IFK Berga and Lindsdals IF, in the lower levels of Swedish football.

References

1935 births
Living people
English footballers
Woodford Town F.C. (1937) players
West Ham United F.C. players
English Football League players
West Ham United F.C. non-playing staff
Footballers from Shoreditch
Association football wing halves
Association football coaches